Xeta is an extinct Tupí–Guaraní language of Brazil.

References

Languages of Brazil
Tupi–Guarani languages
Extinct languages of South America